Omar Abdillahi Charmarke (born 1954) is a Djiboutian long-distance runner who specialized in the marathon.

Charmarke was a member of the first ever Djibouti Olympic team, when he and two others entered the marathon at the 1984 Summer Olympics held in Los Angeles, he finished 32nd in the race.

References

1954 births
Living people
Djiboutian male marathon runners
Athletes (track and field) at the 1984 Summer Olympics
Olympic athletes of Djibouti